CHYC-AM was a Canadian radio station, which broadcast in Montreal, Quebec. It was owned and operated by Northern Electric Co. and was officially closed in 1932.

The call letters "CHYC" were assigned to Northern Electric in 1922.

Sister stations
Other stations during the 1920s through the 1930s.

 CFCF
 CKAC

Notes
 Listening in: the first decade of Canadian broadcasting, 1922-1932 By Mary Vipond
Edition: illustrated Published by McGill-Queen's Press - MQUP, 1992 , 
 The Invisible Empire: A History of the Telecommunications Industry in Canada By Jean-Guy Rens, Käthe Roth Translated by Käthe Roth Edition: illustrated, revised
Published by McGill-Queen's Press - MQUP, 2001 , 9780773520523

References

Nortel
Hyc
Hyc
Radio stations established in 1922
Radio stations disestablished in 1932
1922 establishments in Quebec
1932 disestablishments in Quebec
HYC (AM)